Kiowa Rural Township is the sole township in Kiowa County, Kansas, United States.  The population was 3,278 at the 2000 census, out of whom 2,346 lived in one of the township's three cities and 813 lived in unincorporated areas of the township.  Kiowa Rural Township's boundaries are identical to those of Kiowa County: there are no other townships in the county, and none of the county's cities are governmentally independent.

History
Kiowa Rural Township was once named simply "Kiowa Township."  It has not always been the only township in the county: until 1980-01-01, when all existing townships in the county were dissolved, there was also Martin Township, located near Mullinville in the western part of the county, and Wellsford Township (previously Dowell Township), located near Haviland in the eastern part of the county.  Even these three townships were significantly expanded from past years; in 1940, Kiowa County was composed of fifteen townships: Brenham, Butler, Center, Garfield, Glick, Highland, Kiowa, Lincoln, Martin, Reeder, Union, Ursula, Valley, Wellsford, and Westland.  Although it includes the territories of those former townships, Kiowa Rural Township itself is not important to local government, having become inactive.

Geography
Because Kiowa Rural Township is coterminous with the county, its statistics are similar to the county's.  It covers an area of 722.39 square miles (1871.0 square kilometers); of this, 0.2 square miles (0.5 square kilometers) or 0.03%, is water.

Six cemeteries are located in the township: Belvidere, Boles, Fairview, Haviland, Hillcrest, and McKinley.

Communities
Seven populated places are located in Kiowa Rural Township:
Belvidere
Brenham
Greensburg
Haviland
Joy
Mullinville
Wellsford

Adjacent townships
South Brown Township, Edwards County — northern border, west
Franklin Township, Edwards County — northern border, central
Lincoln Township, Edwards County — northern border, east
Township 8, Pratt County — northeastern corner
Township 9, Pratt County — eastern border, north
Township 10, Pratt County — eastern border, central
Turkey Creek Township, Barber County — eastern border, south
Powell Township, Comanche County — southern border, east
Coldwater Township, Comanche County — southern border, central
Protection Township, Comanche County — southern border, west
Lexington Township, Clark County — southwestern corner
Liberty Township, Clark County — western border, south
Bucklin Township, Ford County — western border, central and north
Wheatland Township, Ford County — northwestern corner

Transportation
Major highways in Kiowa Rural Township include U.S. Routes 54, 183, and 400.  As well, two airports are located in the township: Gail Ballard Municipal Airport and Paul Windle Municipal Field.

References

External links
 City-Data.com
 United States Census Bureau cartographic boundary files

Townships in Kiowa County, Kansas
Townships in Kansas